Heuglin's masked weaver (Ploceus heuglini) is a species of bird in the weaver family, Ploceidae.
It is found in Senegal, Gambia and Mali to Ivory Coast and east to Uganda and western Kenya.

References

External links
 Heuglin's masked weaver -  Species text in Weaver Watch.

Heuglin's masked weaver
Birds of Sub-Saharan Africa
Birds of West Africa
Heuglin's masked weaver
Taxonomy articles created by Polbot